The 18th Lumières Awards ceremony, presented by the Académie des Lumières, was held on 18 January 2013, at the Théâtre de la Gaîté in Paris. The ceremony was chaired by Victoria Abril. Amour won three awards including Best Film.

Winners and nominees
Winners are listed first and highlighted in bold.

See also
 38th César Awards
 3rd Magritte Awards

References

External links
 
 
 18th Lumières Awards at AlloCiné

Lumières Awards
Lumières
Lumières